Narasimham may refer to:

 Chilakamarthi Lakshmi Narasimham, Indian playwright and novelist
 M. Narasimham, governor of the Reserve Bank of India
 Nishtala Appala Narasimham, Indian spectroscopist
 P. Appala Narasimham, Indian parliamentarian
 Narasimham Committee on Banking Sector Reforms (1998)
 Narasimha, a Hindu god
 Narasimham (film), a 2000 Malayalam movie starring Mohanlal

ml:നരസിംഹം (മലയാളചലച്ചിത്രം)